Master of Study is a South Korean television series that aired on KBS2 from January 4 to February 23, 2010 on Mondays and Tuesdays at 21:55 for 16 episodes. It starred Kim Soo-ro, Bae Doona, Oh Yoon-ah, Yoo Seung-ho,  Go Ah-sung, Lee Hyun-woo, Park Ji-yeon,
and Lee Chan-ho.

Based on the Japanese comic series Dragon Zakura, it is about a determined lawyer who takes up a teaching position at a failing high school. To save the school from the ax, he comes up with the unconventional plan of starting a special class curriculum devoted to getting five students into the country's top university.

Master Of Study achieved nationwide as well as international success topping ratings during its 2-month run and scoring multiple nods in different local and overseas awards ceremonies. The series is also one of KBS's most watched series online.

Synopsis 
When scrappy and abrasive lawyer Kang Suk-ho is put in charge of the liquidating Byung Moon High School, he sees his own troubled past in the problematic students who live their lives with no dreams. He then offers to teach them and proclaims that he will get five students accepted into Cheonha University, the most prestigious college in the country. Everyone—including the teachers, students and the school's director Jang Ma-ri—calls him crazy. Quirky and earnest English teacher Han Soo-jung, who believes that the purpose of education is not about getting into a good college, likewise initially objects to Suk-ho's teaching methods and motivations. But he establishes a special class for the five delinquent students, including Hwang Baek-hyun who bumps heads right away with Suk-ho, to help them prepare for Cheonha University.

Cast

Main 
 Kim Soo-ro as Kang Suk-ho 강석호 
 He is a lawyer who was put in charge of liquidating Byung Moon High School. Initially he was unwilling to do so but he recalled the help he received during his time at Byung Moon High, which helped him change from a delinquent teenager who frequently fought into a relatively successful person in society. Thus, he came up with the plan of setting up a "special class" that aims to get students into Cheonha University to improve the school's reputation. He also intended to reform the teaching staff at the school.

 His proposals met with stiff resistance from the staff, the parents and the students of the school. However, his headstrong attitude managed to push through his reforms, and he eventually managed to help the five students from the special class to achieve high grades in the college entrance examination.

 Bae Doona as Han Soo-jung 한수정 
 An English teacher at Byung Moon High School. She got tricked into becoming a teaching assistant of the special class, though she later became very passionate about this responsibility.

 Oh Yoon-ah as Jang Ma-ri 장마리 
 The principal of the school, after the previous principal, who is also her father, was hospitalized. She reluctantly allowed Suk-ho to set up a special class under strict conditions after he threatened that her financial indiscretions would come to light. Later, she took over Soo-jung's classes to concentrate her duties as an assistant to the special class. Eventually, she starts to develop a crush on Suk-ho. After he had left the school, she set up a "special, special class" that was modeled on his special class idea.

 Yoo Seung-ho as Hwang Baek-hyun 황백현 
 His parents died and he lived with his grandmother in a poor house. He was a bad student (Koltong), but after he studied in the special class with the help of Kang Suk-ho, he slowly realized his potential. Later, he went to Tae Pyeong University to study to be a doctor.

 Go Ah-sung as Gil Pul-ip 길풀입 
She grew up in a single parent, and had problems with her mother who loves a married man. A hardworking student, she entered the top university, Cheonha University.

 Lee Hyun-woo as Hong Chan-doo 홍찬두  
 He loved dancing, but faces opposition from his father wanted him to study abroad. Later, his father finally agreed and Hong Chan-doo chose to give up college to pursue dance.

 Park Ji-yeon as Na Hyun-jung 나현정 
 She had a crush on Hwang Baek-hyun. When she found out that he loves Gil Pul-ip, she lost her way for a short time. However, she came back to the special class and eventually pursued her love for drawing.

 Lee Chan-ho as Oh Bong-goo 오봉구 
 He grew up in a meat restaurant, and his parents don't really care about his education. The actual reason that he joined the special class was to get rid of the bullying because of his appearance. Later, he entered Cheonha University.

Supporting 
 Byun Hee-bong as Cha Ki-bong
 Lee Byung-joon as Anthony Yang
 Im Ji-eun as Lee Eun-yoo
 Ko Joo-yeon as Lee Ye-ji
 Shim Hyung-tak as Jang Young-shik
 Park Chil-yong as Ha Sang-gil
 Lee Dal-hyung as Park Nam
 Im Sung-min as Bae Young-sook
 Kim Young-ok as Lee Boon-yi
 Bang Eun-hee as Han Ae-shim
 Kim Ha-kyun as Oh Dal-shik
 Park Chul-ho as Hong Choong-shik
 Koo Hye-ryung as Hwang Geum-joo
 Kang Yi-seul as Kim Jung-hee
 Park Hwi-soon as Sa Do-chul
 T-ara as cameo (ep 7, 8, 10)
 Jeon Ji-hoo as supporting
 Hong Il-kwon

Production 
This was Kim Su-ro's first leading role in a television drama (he had previously appeared mainly in films). Kim, who played a humanistic teacher in the film Our School's E.T., yet plays a completely opposite role as Kang Suk-ho in Master of Study, said that "both methods are correct. Kang Suk-ho's method is appropriate for the children in the drama, who want to prove themselves by getting into a good school." He added that the show is not about the obvious cliche—that high school seniors must study for college, but rather about taking on the challenge of getting into the top school just to get back at the credential-obsessed society.

Dragon Zakura creator/artist Norifusa Mita complimented the show, saying, "It is energetic and entertaining. The characters have depth. I am satisfied." The popular manga was also turned into a 2005 TBS drama series in Japan.

Release 
The drama premiered in South Korea on January 4, 2010. It received a nationwide rating of 15,1%.

The drama was released in 2 DVD boxe sets in Japan, the first DVD-Box1 on November 19, 2010, DVD-BOX2 was released on December 3, 2010 by Culture Publishers. Each DVD-BOX is a set of 4 discs.

Critical reception 
People's Daily praised the drama for achieved cultural penetration and artistic subversion especially considering that it's a remake. It also  pointed that despite the strong "comedy color" of the show, the specific learning methods still have a positive impact on the audience.

Ratings
Master of Study scored solid ratings since its premiere and eventually became the top-rated show in its Monday and Tuesday evening time slot. According to daily statistics released by research firms TNS Media Korea and AGB Nielsen Media Research, the drama scored national viewership ratings of 26.8 and 25.1 percent, respectively, for its final episode, the highest ratings the show recorded during its two-month airing.

Impact and legacy 
The show became a huge success especially in South East Asia, it was mostly loved for its "school theme". The show became an incentive for students, mainly high school students.People's Daily reported that the TV series had a strong impact on many children and students suddenly become interested in studying.

KBS's official YouTube channel KBS World released the full series on YouTube on 2015. It has amassed over 20,000,000 views since; making one of the channel's most watched dramas.

Awards and nominations

International broadcast

Streaming platforms 
Rights to the show were sold to multiple online video streaming platforms including the Chinese platform IQIYI.

References

External links
  
 
 

Korean Broadcasting System television dramas
2010 South Korean television series debuts
Korean-language television shows
2010 South Korean television series endings
South Korean television dramas based on manga
South Korean teen dramas
Examinations and testing in fiction
Television series by Drama House
Dragon Zakura